Publius Aelius Ligus was a  consul of the Roman Republic in 172 BC, serving with fellow consul Gaius Popillius Laenas. Aelius Ligus probably was praetor in 175 BC.

The first plebeian college of consuls was in 172, which included Ligus. Both consuls were sent to Liguria.

References 

Roman Republican praetors
2nd-century BC Roman consuls
Ligus, Publius